Jeffrey H. Lorber (born November 4, 1952) is an American keyboardist, composer, and record producer. After six previous nominations, Lorber won his first Grammy Award on January 28, 2018 for Best Contemporary Instrumental Album for Prototype by his band the Jeff Lorber Fusion.

Many of his songs have appeared on the Weather Channel's Local on the 8s segments and on the channel's compilation albums, The Weather Channel Presents: The Best of Smooth Jazz and The Weather Channel Presents: Smooth Jazz II. He was nominated for a Grammy Award for his album He Had a Hat (Blue Note, 2007)

Early life
Lorber was born to a Jewish family in Cheltenham, Pennsylvania, the same suburb as Michael and Randy Brecker, with whom he would later play. He started to play the piano when he was four years old. After playing in a number of R&B bands as a teen, he attended Berklee College of Music, where he developed his love for jazz. At Berklee he met and played alongside guitarist John Scofield. He moved to Vancouver, Washington in 1972. For several years he studied chemistry at Boston University.

Jeff Lorber Fusion

His first group, the Jeff Lorber Fusion, released their self-titled debut album The Jeff Lorber Fusion in 1977 on Inner City Records. Supported by a revolving cast of musicians, including drummer Dennis Bradford, he recorded five studio albums under this moniker. These early albums showcased a funky sound influenced by other jazz fusion practitioners such as Herbie Hancock, Weather Report, and Return to Forever, the latter's Chick Corea appearing on several songs. Like his contemporaries, Lorber performed on multiple keyboard instruments, including piano, Rhodes piano, and analog synthesizers, often favoring the Minimoog and Sequential Circuits Prophet 5. The Jeff Lorber Fusion's 1980 album, Wizard Island, introduced saxophonist Kenneth Bruce Gorelick, better known as Kenny G.

Solo career
In 1984 he released his second solo album In the Heat of the Night and Jeff Lorber Fusion compilation album Lift Off. Later that year, he and the production duo of David Frank and Mic Murphy, otherwise known as the System, produced Step by Step. The title track, written with Anita Pointer of the Pointer Sisters, rose to number 31 on the U.S. Billboard R&B chart. The song "Facts of Love" (featuring Karyn White) from the 1986 album Private Passion was his biggest chart hit, reaching No. 27 on the Billboard Hot 100 and No. 17 on the R&B chart. Several singles from this period also appeared on the Billboard Dance charts. However, Lorber was not satisfied that he was being overtaken by a more vocal and R&B feel on his own albums, so he took a seven-year hiatus. After Step by Step, he quoted Clive Davis as telling him, "We really want you to put more vocals on your records", which Lorber thought was a mistake.

Lorber's keyboard work appeared in the video game Castlevania: Symphony of the Night. His input can be heard during the game's closing theme song "I Am the Wind" (which also featured the saxophonist Gerald Albright).

Two greatest hits compilation albums were released in 2000 and 2002. Flipside (2005) was nominated for a Grammy Award in the Best Pop Instrumental Album category. At the 56th Annual Grammy Awards, his 2013 album Hacienda was nominated for Best Pop Instrumental Album. In 2018, he received a Grammy for his album Prototype in the Best Contemporary Instrumental Album category.

Lorber has done extensive production and session work for other musicians, including Dave Koz, Eric Benét, Herb Alpert, Carol Duboc and Laura Branigan. He hosts a show on Sirius Satellite Radio.

Personal life

In 2004, Lorber was diagnosed with polycystic kidney disease and received a successful kidney transplant from his wife Mink Lorber.

He has served as a spokesman for the PKD Foundation, an organization for fighting polycystic kidney disease. He has mentioned that the disease is common in his family. His daughters have it and his mother and sister died from it.

Discography

Jeff Lorber Fusion - albums

Jeff Lorber - solo albums

Jazz Funk Soul - albums
Jeff Lorber, Everette Harp, Chuck Loeb (2014—2017), and now Paul Jackson, Jr.

Singles
Solo

Jeff Lorber Fusion

Jazz Funk Soul

References

External links

 Official site
 Jeff Lorber Interview at allaboutjazz.com
 Interview at jazzmonthly.com
 Jeff Lorber & Jeff Lorber Fusion biography, discography and album reviews, credits & releases at AllMusic
 Jeff Lorber discography, album releases & credits at Discogs
 Jeff Lorber Fusion discography, album releases & credits at Discogs
 Jeff Lorber albums to be listened as stream on Spotify
 Jeff Lorber Fusion albums to be listened as stream on Spotify

1952 births
20th-century American pianists
American jazz keyboardists
American jazz pianists
American male pianists
American radio personalities
Berklee College of Music alumni
Crossover jazz pianists
Jazz fusion pianists
Jazz-pop pianists
Jewish American musicians
Jewish jazz musicians
Living people
Musicians from Philadelphia
Musicians from Portland, Oregon
Narada Productions artists
Kidney transplant recipients
People from Cheltenham, Pennsylvania
People from Vancouver, Washington
Smooth jazz musicians
Smooth jazz pianists
Jazz musicians from Pennsylvania
21st-century American pianists
20th-century American male musicians
21st-century American male musicians
American male jazz musicians
Jazz musicians from Washington (state)
21st-century American Jews